The 2013 Individual Long Track/Grasstrack World Championship was the 43rd edition of the FIM speedway Individual Long Track World Championship.

The world title was won by Joonas Kylmäkorpi of Finland for the fourth consecutive year.

Venues

Final Classification

References 

2013
Speedway competitions in France
Speedway competitions in Germany
Speedway competitions in Norway
Speedway competitions in Poland
Speedway competitions in Finland
Long
2013 in Norwegian sport
2013 in Finnish sport
2013 in Polish speedway
2013 in Dutch motorsport
2013 in German motorsport
2013 in French motorsport